Círculo Eborense, also known as Clube, is a Portuguese non-profit cultural and recreational association. It is located in the center of Évora, Portugal. It is the first voluntary association of its kind to be created in Évora. It was formally constituted on January 9, 1837, through a royal decree. Supporters had gathered about 36 signatures.  

It was formed as part of the burgeoning European club movement. Its goals were to create a space for social gatherings and recreation. Activities included ballroom games, dances, family gatherings, concerts musicals, etc. It served as a model for other congenial clubs.

Membership is dependent on moral and civil requirements and the obligation to pay a jewel and dues, limiting it to the social elites of Évora. Ordinary members lived in Évora and surrounding areas, while extraordinary members were temporary residents in Évora or other municipalities.

Its headquarters is located in a noble house in the old wide of the painted houses, on Vasco da Gama street.

Its organizational structure includes a General Meeting, Board of Directors and Fiscal Council.

References

External links
Archeevo - Governo Civil do Distrito de Évora

Archeevo - Universidade de Évora

PASEV | PATRIMONIALIZAÇÃO DA PAISAGEM SONORA EM ÉVORA (1540 - 1910) Cidehus - Universidade de Évora

Arquivo Distrital de Évora

Estatutos Círculo Eborense 1880

O “Inventário” de 1858 do Circulo Eborense, Sociabilidad y Élites

Sociabilidade alentejana nos documentos, Sociabilidad y Élites

Os Estatutos do primeiro Circulo Eborense, Sociabiliad y Élites

Circulo Eborense, Sociabilidad y Élites

Associacionismo, Círculos/A chave da associação - Arquivos do bem privado ao público, Sociabilidad y Élites

OS PATRIMÓNIOS DA SOCIABILIDADE I | As Associações em Évora, video

1836 establishments in Portugal
Organizations established in 1836
Clubs and societies in Portugal
Évora